Curculigo ensifolia is a plant species in the Hypoxidaceae, endemic to Australia.

Varieties
 Curculigo ensifolia var. ensifolia – Queensland, New South Wales, Northern Territory, Western Australia 
 Curculigo ensifolia var. longifolia Benth. – Northern Territory

References

ensifolia
Plants described in 1810
Endemic flora of Australia
Taxa named by Robert Brown (botanist, born 1773)